Norman John Frank Rodway (7 February 1929 – 13 March 2001) was an Anglo-Irish actor.

Early life 
Rodway was born at the family home, Elsinore (named after the castle where Shakespeare's Hamlet is set), on Coliemore Road, Dalkey, Dublin, to Lillian Sybil (née Moyles) and Frank Rodway, who ran a shipping agency. His parents were English, and had moved to Dublin two years before he was born because his father had been posted there for work. He was educated at St Andrew's Church of Ireland National School and the High School, then studied at Trinity College Dublin, where he was elected a Scholar in classics in 1948. He worked as an accountant, teacher, and lecturer in Latin and Greek at Trinity before acting.

Career 
He made his stage debut in May 1953 at the Cork Opera House. There, he portrayed General Mannion in The Seventh Step. He made his first appearance in London's West End in 1959, as The Messenger in Cock-A-Doodle Dandy, and moved to England the following year. In 1962, he portrayed the young James Joyce in Stephen D, based on Joyce's writings. Rodway joined the Royal Shakespeare Company in 1966. His theatrical parts included Bassov in Summerfolk, and the title roles in Butley and Richard III.

Although he was primarily a stage actor, he also performed in radio, television and film productions. With his expressive voice (described by Jack Adrian as "rich and dark and thumpingly Celtic"), he made many radio broadcasts for the BBC.  Major television roles included Cummings in Reilly, Ace of Spies, and Charles Brett in The Bretts. He also appeared in series such as Miss Marple, Rumpole of the Bailey and Inspector Morse. He acted with Orson Welles in Chimes at Midnight (1965) and I'll Never Forget What's'isname (1967), and with Patrick McGoohan in an episode of Danger Man, "The Man Who Wouldn't Talk". He often acted as the villain, including Adolf Hitler in The Empty Mirror (1999).  He played the role of Apemantus in both television and audiobook productions of Shakespeare's Timon of Athens.

Personal life 
He was married four times. His first wife was actress Pauline Delaney, and his second was casting director Mary Selway. He was stepfather to Tara FitzGerald by his third marriage to Sarah Callaby (née Fitzgerald); Rodway and Callaby had a daughter, Bianca. He was married to Jane Rodway from 1991 to his death.

Filmography

Film

Television

Sources 
 Contemporary Theatre, Film, and Television (vol. 26), 2000
 Who’s Who in Theatre, 1981

Footnotes

External links 
 

1929 births
2001 deaths
20th-century Irish male actors
21st-century Irish male actors
Academics of Trinity College Dublin
Alumni of Trinity College Dublin
Irish expatriates in England
Irish male film actors
Irish male stage actors
Irish male television actors
Irish people of English descent
Male actors from Dublin (city)
People educated at The High School, Dublin
People from Dalkey
Royal Shakespeare Company members
Scholars of Trinity College Dublin